The 2013 World Senior Curling Championships was held at the newly constructed Grant-Harvey Centre in Fredericton, New Brunswick from April 13 to 20. The event was held in conjunction with the 2013 World Mixed Doubles Curling Championship.

Men

Round Robin Standings
Final Round Robin Standings

Playoffs

Bronze-medal game
Saturday, April 20, 14:00

Gold-medal game
Saturday, April 20, 14:00

Women

Round Robin Standings
Final Round Robin Standings

Playoffs

Bronze-medal game
Saturday, April 20, 14:00

Gold-medal game
Saturday, April 20, 14:00

References
General

Specific

World Senior Curling Championships, 2013
Curling competitions in Fredericton
World Senior Curling Championships
International curling competitions hosted by Canada